Espigan (also Romanized as Espīgān; also known as Esfīkān and Espīkān) is a village in Kork and Nartich Rural District, in the Central District of Bam County, Kerman Province, Iran. At the 2006 census, its population was 3,449, in 916 families.

References 

Populated places in Bam County